The men's triple jump event at the 1972 European Athletics Indoor Championships was held on 11 March in Grenoble.

Results

References

Triple jump at the European Athletics Indoor Championships
Triple